Who Do You Trust? is the tenth studio album by American rock band Papa Roach. It was released on January 18, 2019, through Eleven Seven Music. Four singles have been released from the album: "Who Do You Trust?", "Elevate", "Come Around" and "The Ending".

Background and composition
Frontman Jacoby Shaddix told Rock Sound that because the band's plan to tour with Of Mice & Men fell through due to lead singer Austin Carlile getting sick, the band went into the studio to record: "So we went in and created five or six songs. Then we went back in June and July and took another stab at it. We have 12 songs – there's bangers in there."

Bassist Tobin Esperance stated that the band's goal for the album "was to push ourselves even further into genres that inspire us most. We have reached the place where we always wanted to be, creating new and exciting music". The two lead singles have been said to feature Papa Roach's "signature heavy rhythmic guitars and catchy hooks", while "Not the Only One" contains "melody and emotionally charged lyrics".

Drummer Tony Palermo commented that the album would be "one of the most eclectic records they'd ever done". Palermo shared that their influence came from a number of places, stating, "we're constantly influenced by things around us, and we try to create things that are a little bit different from the last things we've done." Commenting on the band's constantly changing music style, Palermo responded "we sort of paved this way, and we're evolving just as naturally, I think, as we can".

Promotion
"Renegade Music" and the title track were released on October 5, 2018 with Loudwire calling the former a "driving new anthem" and the latter "aggressive and catchy". "Not the Only One" accompanied the release of the album's details. An official music video for the song was released on May 30, 2019. On December 14, the second single, "Elevate" was released and called a "catchy number" by Loudwire and compared it to the likes of Imagine Dragons. It was accompanied by an official music video released on March 25, 2019. A third single, "Come Around", along with an accompanying music video, was released in September 2019.

Critical reception

Who Do You Trust? was met with generally positive reviews from critics. At the aggregating website Metacritic, the album has received a normalized rating of 67 out of 100, based on 4 critical reviews, indicating "generally favorable" reviews. Wall of Sound rated the album 8/10 stating: "Papa Roach just continue to evolve and kill the game with being inventive, but with that old school spirit, such a hard task to do for some." Loudwire named it one of the 50 best rock albums of 2019.

Track listing
All tracks produced by Nicholas "RAS" Furlong and Colin Brittain, except "Top of the World", produced by Jason Evigan.

Charts

References

2019 albums
Papa Roach albums
Eleven Seven Label Group albums
Albums produced by Colin Brittain